The Basel Dove (Basel German: Basler Dybli) is a notable stamp issued by the Swiss canton of Basel on 1 July 1845 with a value of 2½-rappen. It was the first tricolor stamp in the world and the only postage stamp issued by Basel. At the time each canton was responsible for its own postal service.  There were no uniform postal rates for Switzerland until after the establishment of a countrywide postal service on 1 January 1849. The only other cantons to issue their own stamps were Zürich and Geneva.

The stamp, designed by the architect Melchior Berri, featured a white embossed dove carrying a letter in its beak, and was inscribed "STADT POST BASEL". The stamp is printed in black, crimson and blue, making it the world's first tri-coloured stamp. It was valid for use until 30 September 1854, by which time 41,480 stamps had been printed.

See also
List of notable postage stamps
Stamps and postal history of Switzerland

References

Further reading

External links 
Helvetia Philatelic Society - Basel Dove page.
Pictures from 200 Basel Dove Letters.
 Pairs of Basel Dove.
 Basel Dove with border.
 Postmarks on Basel Doves.

Postage stamps of Switzerland
Birds on stamps